CAR-301,060 (also known as cis-2-Methyl-3-quinuclidinylphenylcyclopentylglycolate or just by its code number 301060) is a potent and long lasting anticholinergic deliriant drug, related to the chemical warfare agent 3-Quinuclidinyl benzilate (QNB). It was developed under contract to Edgewood Arsenal during the 1960s as part of the US military chemical weapons program, during research to improve upon the properties of earlier agents such as QNB.

CAR-301,060 was found to be slightly less potent than QNB, and with around the same duration of action, but with a very high central to peripheral effects ratio.

See also 
 EA-3167
 EA-3443
 CAR-302,196
 Ditran

References 

Deliriants
Muscarinic antagonists
Incapacitating agents
Quinuclidines
Phenylcyclopentylglycolate esters